Navin Sinha is a former Judge of Supreme Court of India. Justice Sinha was elevated as a Judge of the Patna High Court before serving as Chief justice of Chhattisgarh High Court and after that as the Chief justice of Rajasthan High Court before being elevated to the Supreme Court of India.

Early life and education
Sinha was born on 19 August 1957. He was born in a family of Lawyers/Administrators. Justice Sinha did his schooling at St. Xavier's High School, Patna, and passed out in 1972. He moved on to New Delhi to do his graduation from Hindu College, Delhi and did his LLB from Campus Law Centre of the Faculty of Law, University of Delhi, in 1979.

Career
Sinha joined bar on 26 July 1979 and practised for 23 years primarily at Patna High Court and specialised in civil, constitutional, labour, service, commercial, company, criminal laws. He was elevated as a judge there. He was made a permanent judge of Patna High Court on 4 February 2004. He was transferred to Chhattisgarh High Court on 9 July 2014.

Justice Navin Sinha was sworn in as the new Chief Justice of the Rajasthan High Court on May 14, 2016. Justice Sinha was administered the oath as the 31st chief justice of the Rajasthan High Court by Governor Kalyan Singh.

References

1956 births
Living people
Judges of the Chhattisgarh High Court
Judges of the Patna High Court
20th-century Indian lawyers
Chief Justices of Chhattisgarh High Court
20th-century Indian judges
Justices of the Supreme Court of India